Dog fennel, dog-fennel, or dogfennel is a common name for several plants and may refer to: 

 Anthemis cotula, an annual plant up to about 60 cm tall, native to Europe and North Africa but naturalized in other parts of the world as well
 Chamaemelum
 Eupatorium capillifolium, a perennial plant up to about 2 m tall, native to eastern North America

See also
 Dysodiopsis, false dogfennel